Igerna is a genus of leafhoppers.

Species 
 Igerna bimaculicollis (Stål, 1855)
 Igerna delta Viraktamath & Gonçalves, 2013
 Igerna flavocosta Viraktamath & Gonçalves, 2013
 Igerna malagasica Viraktamath & Gonçalves, 2013
 Igerna neosa (Webb, 1980)

References 

Cicadellidae genera
Megophthalminae